Jáltipan is a municipality in Veracruz, Mexico. It is located in the southern part of the state of Veracruz, about 380 km from state capital Xalapa. It has a surface of 331.48 km2.

The municipality of Jáltipan is delimited to the north by Chinameca, to the east by Oteapan, Zaragoza, Cosoleacaque and Hidalgotitlán, and to the west by Texistepec and Soconusco.

It produces principally maize, beans, rice, and oranges.

The weather in Jáltipan is warm all year with rains in summer and autumn.

The town was severely damaged during an earthquake in 1959.

References

External links 

  
 Municipal official information  

Municipalities of Veracruz
Year of establishment missing